Kenneth Robert Wallace (born 8 June 1952) is an English retired professional footballer who played as a forward in the Football League for Hereford United, Exeter City and Brentford. He was the scorer of Hereford United's first-ever Football League goal in 1972.

Personal life 
After his retirement from football, Wallace settled in Bexleyheath.

Career statistics

References 

1952 births
English footballers
English Football League players
Brentford F.C. players
Living people
Footballers from Islington (district)
Association football forwards
West Ham United F.C. players
Montreal Olympique players
Hereford United F.C. players
Southern Football League players
Exeter City F.C. players
English expatriate sportspeople in Canada
English expatriate footballers
Expatriate soccer players in Canada
North American Soccer League (1968–1984) players
Dover F.C. players
Maidstone United F.C. (1897) players
Crawley Town F.C. players
Welling United F.C. players
Chelmsford City F.C. players